"Give It All" is a song recorded by American rock band Train for their seventh studio album Bulletproof Picasso. It was released on May 19, 2015, as the fourth single from the album.

Music video
A music video to accompany the release of "Give It All" was first released onto YouTube on 19 May 2015 at a total length of four minutes and one second.

Track listing

Chart performance

Weekly charts

Release history

References

2014 songs
Columbia Records singles
Train (band) songs
Songs written by Pat Monahan
Rock ballads
Folk ballads